Jovan Jovanović Zmaj Gymnasium is a secondary school in Novi Sad, Serbia. It is named after Jovan Jovanović Zmaj, a Serb poet. It was founded in 1810 by a donation of a wealthy merchant  from Novi Sad.

The school was rebuilt in the 20th century, using the donations of baron Miloš Bajić who gave 20,000 forints.

History

19th century

Founding of the school

Jovan Jovanović Zmaj High School in Novi Sad is one of the oldest cultural and educational institutions in Serbia. Through its three-century long existence it has become a proud treasurer of memories of educational development in this country.

At the beginning of the nineteenth century while Napoleon's cannons were changing the political map of Europe, and Karadjordje's rebels were fighting for Serbian independence, a prominent merchant from Novi Sad, Sava Vuković of Beregsova, was thinking of leaving something permanent to remind his people of himself. On St. Sava's Day 1810, blind and seriously ill, Vuković donated 20 000 forints for foundation of a Serbian grammar school in Novi Sad.

However the story of secondary education in Novi Sad does not start with this generous gesture. Back in 1731, at the same spot where the modern building of the school stands, the bishop of Bačka Visaion Pavlović founded a school whose name was “Latino-Slavic Nativity of the Mother of God School”. Bishop Pavlović and the council of the Serbian Orthodox Church were deeply aware of the fact that only a good education in Latin can provide better future for Serbian people in Habsburg Monarchy. Among the best-known students of this school there were Joakim Vujić and Lukijan Mušicki, and the best-known teacher was Zaharije Orfelin. This school continued its work till 1789 when the Serbs from Novi Sad led by promises and reforms of the emperor Joseph II abolished this educational institution in order to make a grammar school for all religions in Novi Sad. For this noble purpose they gave the building and the whole inventory of the school. A fast crash of Joseph's reforms, showed all the haste and imprudence of this gesture, since instead of the state grammar school for all religions in the orthodox part of Novi Sad, a Roman Catholic school was founded.

Because of that Metropolitan Bishop of Karlovci Stefan Stratimirović, Bishop of Bačka Gedeon Petrović and the council of the Eastern Orthodox Church in Novi Sad had a great wish to reopen Serbian Orthodox Grammar School beside the Roman Catholic one.

It was not by chance that Novi Sad became the stage of this historical event. With more than 20 000 inhabitants, hundreds of small shops and well-developed wheat merchandise, Novi Sad was the economical and cultural Serbian centre in Habsburg Monarchy.

In the inaugural letter of Sava Vuković, three basic tasks which the school should fulfill were stated: general education and upbringing in national spirit through the Eastern Orthodox religion and national language. A great number of people from Novi Sad joined this noble act encouraged by Bishop of Bačka Gedeon Petrović and Metropolitan Bishop of Karlovci Stefan Stratimirović, and in this way more than 100,000 forints were collected which was enough for the foundation of school. Lack of higher education institutions forced Serbian youth in Habsburg Monarchy to continue their education in Roman Catholic or Protestant schools which had in itself a fear of distancing them from Serbian religion and nation. Habsburg emperor Frantz I gave his consent for the foundation of the school on December 11, 1811. However, not everything was finished with this emperor's agreement, only on January 31, 1816 the foundation act was confirmed and the conditions for opening the first and second grade, and in November the third grade of the grammar school were made.

Based on the emperor's decision and in accordance with the Foundation Act, Patronage and Board of Trustees were formed as the primary administrative bodies of the school, and they managed the school until 1920. According to the Foundation Act the school was a property of Serbian Orthodox Church in Novi Sad, and the Patronage administrated the school instead of it. At the head of the Patronage there were Metropolitan Bishop of Karlovci and Bishop of Novi Sad; two members were from Backa consistorium, and four from Orthodox Church Council in Novi Sad. The Patronage made decisions about the curriculum and the books which were used. It also chose principals and teachers, and regulated their salaries and awards. In act 7 of the Foundation Act the Board of Trustees was formed and its task was to invest the capital of the school and secures its continuous finances. The Board had six members, mainly rich merchants, craftsmen and lawyers.

The flag of the school was established in 1816. On one side there was Lord Jesus Christ, and on the other Saint Sava. This flag has been preserved till today.

With the arrival of the teachers Georgije Magarašević, Mojsije Petrović, Ignjat Jovanović and Pavel Jozef Šafarik the number of the classes was increased to six, and at the beginning of October 1819 the Serbian Orthodox's Great Grammar School in Novi Sad became a complete grammar school.

First school building

The first school building was next to the Orthodox Cathedral Church, at the spot of today's Platoneum. It was built by the council of Serbian Orthodox Church in 1788 for the needs of Latino-Slavic Nativity of the Mother of God School. With its beauty it attracted everyone who came to Novi Sad. Šafarik said about it:”The building of the school is something unique; I have never seen anything like that”.

The first principals of the grammar school were a priest Danilo Petrović and the mayor Grigorije Janković. With the increased number of students and classes the Patronage took steps to insure the emperor's accreditation for the school. This meant that all graduated students of the school had the right to enroll any academy, lycee and university in Habsburg Monarchy without taking entrance or differential examinations. This accreditation was given to the school by Frantz I on October 26, 1818.

The curriculum was made in accordance with the state regulation “Ratio educationis” which was applied to all state schools in Hungary. The grammar school had six classes until 1848, and all the subjects were taught in German, apart from religious lessons which were taught in Serbian. The following subjects were taught in the grammar school: the basis of Latin and German, Geography, Anthropology and Arithmetic, Latin with syntax, Religious Lessons, Nature Studies and Anthropology, World's History, Archeology, Physics, Logics, Rhetoric, Poetry and Ethics.

The school flourished when a literary historian and a famous scientist Pavel Jozef Šafarik came to its head. In the period of 1816 to 1848 the school had seven principals, and the classes were taught by twenty-seven teachers. The best known among them were Milovan Vidaković, Pavel Jozef Šafarik, Georgije Magarasević i Jovan Hadžić.

Collecting books in order to make a school library started on Šafarik's great insistence in 1819. Ceremonial opening of the library was in 1822 and until 1849 it had about 1600 books.

Because of the importance of religious lessons, classes of church singing were held from the very beginning of the school. The first choir was founded in 1828. A first school of music was opened in the Great Serbian Orthodox Grammar School in 1841 and it was led by a conductor, composer and singer Aleksandar Morfidids-Nisis.

It is thought that in period between 1816 and 1848 more than 3 300 students attended the school which had enormous impact on intelligence and national rebirth of Serbs.

Second school building

The grammar school continued its work up to great revolutionary events of 1848. On June 12, 1849 there was a disastrous bombing of Novi Sad from the Petrovaradin fortress. 2004 of 2812 buildings in the town were burnt down. Among them there was the grammar school building. Beside the building all the didactical equipment and valuable collection for nature study were destroyed. The attempt to save the library was not successful because the books were moved to Almaška Temple (The Church of Three Holy Hierarchs) which was also burnt down.

Terrible war raging caused the school to continue its work only in October 1852. Greatly impoverished the council on the Serbian Orthodox Church collected enough money to enable it happen with enormous effort. It was reopened as an incomplete four-class grammar school which was not accredited. The curriculum at that time included the following subjects: History with Geography, Religious Lessons, Latin, Greek, German, Serbian and Arithmetic. The administration of four-class grammar school was a great load for the Patronage and the council of the Orthodox Church in Novi Sad. The help unexpectedly came from Vienna from the emperor Frantz Joseph personally. It came to Novi Sad on September 27, 1860 and included an offer to finance the school from the state funds and enable it to become a complete eight-class school, but on condition that it preserved its religious and national character. The offer was gladly accepted, but five years had passed before Hungarian regency council informed the Patronage that it was ordered by emperor's resolution to raise the school in Novi Sad to the level of a great grammar school with eight classes. The emperor Frantz Joseph accredited the school with the same resolution. 
At that time the school offered classical humanistic education, which was most evident in the number of classes dedicated to language studying. Back then, the following were the compulsory subjects: Latin, Religious Studies, Serbian, Hungarian, Geography, History, Natural Sciences, Physics, Geometrical Drawing, Philosophy and Calligraphy. The optional subjects included: French, Descriptive Geometry, Church Gospel Singing, Music and Singing (piano, violin, playing in orchestra and tambourine orchestra). In 1854 Dr. Đorđe Natošević, the then principal introduced gymnastics as a compulsory subject and equipped the school with several gymnastic devices. Until the new building for the school was erected, gymnastics classes had been run outside during summer. The school's library continued its work only in 1865, when the Orthodox Church Municipality of Novi Sad assumed the responsibility to regularly finance its work. Invaluably important sources for the study of the school's history are the yearbooks that have been published since 1867. In the school year of 1867/1868 the first GCSE exams were held in the school. Out of eleven candidates who applied to take the exams, one passed with a grade “excellent” while others got the grade “mature”. This event was of great importance since it was the first time that GCSE exams were organized in the Serbian education. Despite many hardships of war, ever since then the school has managed to organize the GCSE exams every year and hold the leading position in our educational system.

As it was decided by the Patriarch Josif Rajačić, all the Serbian schools in the Monarchy accepted Saint Sava as the patron saint of Serb schools and schoolchildren. On that day all the students along with their teachers attended a holy liturgy in the Orthodox Cathedral. The celebration continued in the premises of the school where the special bread-like cake was broken by all in attendance (Slavski Kolač) and the official performance took place in the honour of the celebration.

The political separation of that time that was taking place among the Serbian people affected the school, as well. It found itself in the middle of a conflict between the conservative clergy that governed the school's work via the Patronage on the one hand, and the Liberal party led by Svetozar Miletić that tried to take over the running of the school, on the other. In the period between August 15 and 18, 1866 the premises of the school were used as the whereabouts of the Foundation Assembly of The United Serbian Youth, the romantic revolutionary organization which fought for liberation and unification of the Serbian people. Not uncommon were the conflicts between the Patronage and certain teachers and students, which largely diminished the reputation of the school

After The Austro-Hungarian Compromise of 1867 there ensued the period of great changes in the school's work. Conditioning the state subventions the then Hungarian authorities made an attempt to implement the assimilation policy with respect to the school. In the school year of 1870/71 the Hungarian Assembly approved the funds of 8000 forint to help the school, provided that the Ministry of Education had the right to choose the curriculum and the teachers. The Patronage refused this subsidy claiming that it was in contradiction with the School Foundation Act. The school was successfully run during this period by Vasa Pušibrk (who was the school's principal from 1871 till 1910).

After the Basic Secondary Education Act was implemented in 1883, even greater challenges ensued regarding the preservation of the school's inner autonomy. Since then the Patronage was under direct supervision of the representatives of the Hungarian government, who carried out inspection twice a year and observed the advanced bankruptcy exam. According to the Secondary Education Act from 1883 the school management was obliged to considerably adjust the work and organization to the state schools, which required even higher subsidies.

Apart from the school's fund, the school lived off school's activities and endowments and donations of many of national benefactors. With respect to this, the following should be mentioned: the endowment of Atanasije Gereski, the so-called Atanaseum, Dr. Nikola Krstić from Belgrade, Gedeon Dunđerski, the couple Pajević from Novi Sad, Teodor and Persida Mandić, Luka Milanović, Marija Petrović, Vasa Jovanović Čiča, the endowment of Đorđe Servijski and many others.

During the 1870s the school's premises were no longer sufficient for the school's needs. The Board for Collecting Donations for the extension of the school's premises started with the work in 1897. During this activity, Baron Miloš Bajić (the grandson of Miloš Obrenović) donated 200 000 krones for the construction. The new building was constructed in the Renaissance style where the old one had stood according to the design by Vladimir Nikolić. The construction started on September 22, 1899 and finished on July 1, 1900.

According to the 1899/1900 curriculum, the compulsory subjects were: Religious Sciences, Latin, Greek, Hungarian, German, Serbian, Geography, History, Natural Sciences, Physics, Mathematics, Geometrical Drawing, Philosophy and Calligraphy, while the optional subjects included: French, Shorthand, Instrument Playing (the violin, piano, tambourine, fencing, Octoechos and Religious Science for the Roman Catholics, Protestants and Jews).

The activity of the students was particularly evident in starting numerous student newspapers. In the 19th century these included: “Sloga”, “ Đački Venac ”, “ Zolja ”, “Đačka Matica”. In the beginning of the 20th century these were: “Sova”, “Gusle”, “Šestoškolac”, “Bič”, “Osvitak”, “Napredak” and “Novi đački venac”.

The school had 15,792 students enrolled in the period between 1868 and 1918. The first high school girls were enrolled in the school during the school year of 1894/1895. Most of the students were of the Serbian nationality, but there were also Germans, Jews, Croats, Hungarians, Slovaks, Romanians and Ruthenians, which speaks best about the teaching quality in the school. Unlike in other grammar schools in Hungary, the Patronage decided to set the same school fee for all the students irrespective of their religious orientation and to approve the fee exemption for the students who’d deserve it by their hard work.

Throughout the entire 19th century the school was a real center of intellectual activity. Either as students or as teachers the following great people took part in the school's activity: Jovan Đorđević, Laza Kostić, Jovan Turoman, Đura Daničić, Jovan Jovanović Zmaj, Ilaja Ognjanović-Abukazem, Milorad Popović Šapčanin, Jovan Grčić-Milenko, Paja Marković-Adamov, Milan Savić, Svetozar Miletić, Mihailo Polit-Desančić, Tihomir Ostojić, Isidor Bajić, Stanije Stanojević, Jovan Radonić, Radovan Košutić, Milan Šević, Pavle Vujević, Aleksa Ivić, Radivoj Kašanin, Radivoj Petrović, Jovan Maksimović, Mileta Jakšić, Miloje Milojević, Petar Konjović, and many others.

20th century
Profoundly opposed interests of the great powers in 1914 will plunge mankind into World War I. Due to its vicinity to the battlefield the school's premises were taken over by the army in 1914 and in 1915 it was turned into a military hospital. The teaching staff was scarce on the account of mobilization and other war effects and in the school years 1914/1915 and 1915/1916 only the exams were organized in the school. During the school years 1916/1917 and 1917/1918 regular classes and teaching was carried out but with a lot of difficulties due to the lack of both teachers and money. Therefore, the school years were shortened and semester exams were introduced.

After the war and huge changes, the school continued its work in the liberated and newly united Kingdom of the Serbs, Croats and Slovenes. The school year 1919/1920 started with no significant innovations. The school was still run by the Patronage until August 27, 1920, when the Ministry of Education of the Kingdom of the Serbs, Croats and Slovenes made a decision that would bring the school into the state's possession and give it the name the State Grammar School for Boys in Novi Sad. As it was generally thought, there was no need for the school to continue its work as a private confessional school. This decision came at just the right time, since due to the war-ruined economy, inflation and agrarian reform (by which 353 kJ of land property i.e. the entire land property was taken from the school) the Patronage could no longer cope with economic hardships and finance the school's work on its own. This didn’t mean that the work of the Patronage was over, because it continued to manage the funds and property of the school. The Patronage carried on helping the school's development all until the communist authorities took away the property of the Orthodox Municipality of Novi Sad and funds of the Patronage by the Nationalization Act from December 5, 1946 and its Annex from April 28, 1948. By this act the rights of the Patronage over the school were abolished. The first and foremost task was renewal of the classrooms, library and school's inventory, since the school's premises were turned into a hospital during the war.

The library was particularly damaged because 2/3 of the students’ books and about 2500 of the books from the teachers’ library were lost. For the second time in its history the library would arise from the ashes but not until 1927.

The national freedom and newly created circumstances were most evident in the school curricula. In History classes the emphasis was put on studying the history of the Serbs, Croats and Slovenes, while the Serbian language and mathematics held the leading position by the number of their classes in week. As an expression of the general Francophilia, there came to the increase in the number of classes where French was taught and studied. Regarding the tradition and efforts made by certain teachers, German was taught pretty extensively. There was a strong rivalry between the German and French teachers.

On the 3 October the school changed its name into The State Male Practical High School of King Aleksandar I.

In the period between 1935 and 1937 a three-hectare sports ground for the classes of physical education was built (on the grounds of present-day FC “Index”). Volleyball courts, basketball courts, football fields, tennis courts and gyms were built there. In 1914 the students of this school founded FC “Vojvodina” and doing that they laid the foundation of the sports society which is today one of the biggest in Europe.

In the new country the school developed a very vivid social activity. Lectures were held, students’ meetings and activities were organized. The highest state officials visited it very often because the school was highly respected due to its fame in the past.

When the High Schools of Novi Sad and Karlovci became state schools Serbian nation was left without the classical grammar school. The minister of education Anton Korošec tried to turn back the time when he gave the permission for the renewal of The Serbian Orthodox Novi Sad Grammar School in September 1939. The old grammar school became a subtenant in its own former building. In 1939 this school had one class and in 1940 the second one was opened. The attempt to renew the old grammar school was stopped by the outbreak of World War II.

The dynamic development of The State Male Practical High School of King Aleksandar I was stopped by the April war 1941. The fast crash of the Yugoslav army was a terrible sign of the great suffering of the Serbian nation which followed. The fascist occupying forces entered Novi Sad on 13 April. The school's work was prohibited as it was an institution with an emphasized national significance. A new Hungarian Royal State School with Serbian as a teaching language was founded on the site of the old school. It had two parallel classes in each grade. The aim of this educational institution was to develop the sense of loyalty to Great Hungary and to make the preconditions for the process of hungarisation through the lessons of Hungarian language and history. The basic subject was Hungarian language and the classes were held in Serbian. The teachers had to speak Hungarian among themselves.

Denationalization and hungarisation were obvious not only in the classes and extracurricular activities but also in the changes of some subjects. The study of national history was put out of the curriculum and the study of Hungarian history was introduced.

During the war the school library was seriously destroyed. The aggressor decided that the school library can hold only the samples of the books printed before the decline of the Austro-Hungarian Empire i.e. before the creation of the Kingdom of the Serbs, Croatians and Slovenians. The patronage got 11,050 books to keep and over 20 000 disappeared. After World War II the books were given to the library of Matica Srpska to be kept there.

During the difficult days of occupation the people were expelled and killed on a massive scale (the raid in Novi Sad in 1942) and all the suffering finished in October 1944. It is supposed that about 213 students and teachers of the school lost their lives during the war.

Three high schools were founded in Novi Sad on 28 February 1945: Male (which was previously on the spot of Platoneum and was later moved to the building in Futoska Street), Mixed (on the spot of today's Music school) and Female (in the building of the previous Civil school). After Bulgarian army had moved out of the school's building, the Mixed School moved in on the 30 June 1945.

In the school year 1950/51 Male school from Futoška Street was moved into the present-day building of the school and the uniform First Mixed High School was founded, and earlier high school became the Second Mixed High School. Next year, The First Mixed High School becomes Mixed School “Svetozar Marković”, and The Second Mixed High School got the name “Jovan Jovanović-Zmaj”. In order to use these schools’ space in the best possible way they were united into the High School “Jovan Jovanović-Zmaj” in the school year 1959/60.

After the liberation of the country, because of the large-scale poverty and the lack of basic didactic device, the classes were held with the great dedication of the teachers. The lack of course books and professional teaching staff as well as classes with the great number of students represented one more difficulty of that time.

After World War II Yugoslavia happened to be in the Communist group so that the whole process of education was followed by the focus on the social-political education on the basis of Marxist study. Until the conflict with Inform biro in 1947 Yugoslav Government blindly copied USSR's social system, which had negative effects on the education-“the reduction of criteria and leveling in work demands with higher elementary school children and secondary school children.” The church was severely criticized by the Communist regime so that religious education was put out of the curriculum for the first time since the school's foundation.

The period from the end of the World War II until the decline of the SFRY has seen many reforms in the education. Novi Sad high school has been used by education authorities as an indicator of success of certain reforms, showing its reputation in the new socialist society.

According to the General Education Act from 1958, the school had to give its students the profound knowledge in science and humanities and general-technical knowledge. The innovation was that teaching was divided into general and optional. General teaching involved: Serbo-Croatian and literature, history, sociology with the basics of political-economics, Yugoslav social system, logic and psychology, philosophy, art, foreign language (besides Russian which was dominant after the liberation, English, German and French were introduced), biology, chemistry, physics, mathematics, crafts, physical education and premilitary training.

Optional teaching was divided into four departments: humanities (social science and the second foreign language), natural sciences- first group (mathematics, chemistry, physics), natural sciences-second group (biology, physics, chemistry) and foreign language (second foreign language and Latin). The aim of this kind of teaching was to make a basis for further specialized training and to create a socialist point of view to the world. On the basis of this federal law, NR Serbia decided that the high schools in Serbia should be divided into two departments: humanities and science.

After a great school reform initiated by Stipe Šuvar, from 1977 until 1983, the school worked as a Centre for the education of staff in social activities.

In its printed report, High School “Jovan Jovanović-Zmaj” announced the following:” In accordance to the reform of secondary school education in the Socialist Autonomous province of Vojvodina, starting from the following school year this school will work under the name Centre for the education of staff in social activities “Jovan Jovanović-Zmaj” and will be teaching the future professionals in law, mathematics, IT, biology, physics, chemistry and geography.” Six years after this careless and unsuccessful reform it again became Secondary school for science “Jovan Jovanović-Zmaj”. Since the school year 1990/91 the school got the name High School “Jovan Jovanović-Zmaj”. Today the official name is Grammar School “Jovan Jovanović-Zmaj”.

The decline of the country, economic and political isolation caused not only the reconsideration of the values in the society but also the crisis of educational system. Besides this, the school managed to preserve its reputation, especially with the opening of the special mathematical classes for gifted students.

21st century
After the democratic changes on 5 October 2000, the development of the school went into two directions: not only did the school become the leader in introducing innovations and higher standards in secondary education but it also returned to its glorious tradition and past which this educational institution has. There are six departments at school today: natural sciences department, bilingual department, department for mathematically gifted students, department for gifted students in area of computers, department for gifted students in area of physics and general-sports department. Since 2007 there have been experimental classes of the last two primary school grades (7th and 8th grade). The first official class of 7th and 8th grade is class of 2001 (it officially started in 2016). The school is equipped with three modern IT study rooms and specialized rooms for mathematics, physics, chemistry and biology with the laboratories, school library with 30 000 books, stateroom and gym. There are extracurricular activities like choir and orchestra, French drama group, reciting group, eco club, debate club, editorial staff of the school newspaper “Skamija” (founded in 1972), linguistic workshop, psychology workshop, chemistry and biology workshop, art workshop and IT and robotics workshop. For years the cultural exchange of teachers and students has been realized with a High School from Slaný (Czech Republic), and from this year the same form of exchange will start with the High School from Moscow called “Elada”.

In 2016, the gymnasium building was extensively renovated. Besides restoring damaged sections of the interior and exterior structure, the buildings main roof has been altered to accommodate a glass roof for the school museum in the style and place of the old main roof. The building changed its color from white to a vibrant beige color with lighter beige and white highlights in key areas of the masonry and relief. The new color of the building was inspired by the colors of other historical baroque buildings of Novi Sad and surrounding areas.

Study streams
In this school there are several study streams:
 Science and Mathematics (chemistry, math, physics, biology); 1 class
 Bilingual Science and Mathematics (chemistry, math, physics, biology); Bilingual Serbian-English, Serbian-French, Serbian-German and Serbian-Russian; since 2010; 2 classes
 Sports Science and Mathematics (athletes); since 2015; 1 class
 Specialist in Mathematics (for gifted students - Math and Computer Science); 2 classes
 Specialist in Computers (for gifted students - Computer Science, Programming, Mathematics); 3 classes
 Specialist in Physics (for gifted students - Physics, Mechanics, Quantum physics); 1 class
 Specialist in Chemistry and Biology (for gifted students - Chemistry, Biology, Biochemistry, Organic Chemistry); since 2019; 1 class
 Elementary Specialist in Mathematics (for gifted 7th and 8th grade elementary students - Math and Computer Science); since 2007; 1 class
 Elementary Specialist in Computers (for gifted 7th and 8th grade elementary students - Computer Science, Programming, Mathematics); since 2007; 1 class
 Elementary Specialist in Physics (for gifted 7th and 8th grade elementary students - Physics, Mechanics, Quantum physics); since 2007; 1 class

Specialist study streams for elementary students
Since September 2007, the school has held specialty study streams for gifted 7th and 8th grade elementary students for Mathematics, Physics, and Computers, the only school in Vojvodina province that does this.

Part of the gymnasium collegium consists of professors and assistants from the faculties of the University of Novi Sad.

Bilingual study streams
Since September 2010, the school has held bilingual study streams. Bilingual study stream exists in English, French, German, and Russian. The study stream is Science and Mathematics, but math, physics, chemistry, computers, and biology are studied in foreign languages. The rest of the classes are studied in Serbian.

Application exams for bilingual study streams occur 3 weeks before the regular school application exam (which every student is required to pass). For French, DELF A2 level is required. This class was founded by the French Embassy, which follows the education of these students throughout the 4 years. After 4 years, students that pass the French bilingual study stream are given a French language diploma and the right to study in France, without the need to take further language differences tests, as well as a chance for student stipend in France. French study stream students travel to France every year, to test their knowledge of the French language.

Sports study stream
Since 2015, the school has held a Science and Mathematics study stream specific for sports students. These future athletes often have training and competitions during regular school year, and have the school curriculum adjusted for their specific sports.

Principals 

1810–1920

 Pavel Jozef Šafárik, 1819–1826
 Jeftimije Jovanović, 1826–1827
 Danilo Petrović, 1827–1828
 Dr Jovan Hadžić, 1830–1849
 Dr Đorđe Natošević, 1853–1857
 Pavle Jovanović, 1857–1858
 Petar Ninković, 1858–1865
 Konstantin Isaković, 1865–1866
 Aleksandar Gavrilović, 1866–1867
 German Anđelić, 1867–1868
 Aleksandar Gavrilović, 1868–1871
 Vasa Pušibrk, 1871–1910
 Stevan Milovanov, 1918–1920
 
1920–1941

 Marko Vilić, 1920
 Dimitrije Šilić, 1920–1922
 Vasa Danilović, 1922–1925
 Jovan Živojinović, 1925–1926
 Aleksandar Zamurović, 1926–1927
 Mirko Balubdžić, 1927–1932
 Miraš Kićović, 1932–1933
 Milan Jakovljević, 1933
 Dušan Jovanov, 1933–1934
 Dr Branko Magarašević, 1934–1941
 
1941–1944

 Ferenc Medgyessy, 1941
 Kálmán Váradi, 1941–1944
 
1945–present

 Milenko Šuvaković, 1945–1959
 Petar Adamović, 1945–1947 
 Marije Hvala, 1947–1948
 Živan Radmanović, 1948–1949
 Novak Radović, 1959–1965 
 Sloboda Maslać, 1965–1967
 Dr Đorđe Bajić, 1967–1977
 Vera Banić-Carić, 1977–1980
 Marko Cicmil, 1980–2001
 Petar Kojić, 2001–2002 
 Dr Radivoje Petar Stojković, 2002–

Accolades

Medals
Order of Saint Sava 1st Grade of the Kingdom of Yugoslavia, 1935
Order of Merit for the People 1st Grade of the FNR Yugoslavia, 1960
Order of Work with the Red Flag of SFR Yugoslavia, 1985
Order of Saint Sava 1st Grade of the Serbian Orthodox Church, in 2016

Awards
Vukova Award of the Cultural and Educational Community of Serbia, 1970
November Award of the Alliance of Physical Culture Organisations of Serbia, 1971
Spartakova Award, 1972.
Punoletstva Award, 25 May, 1972.
Vojvodina Liberation Award, 1985
Novi Sad's October Award, 1984
Gold plaque for education "Biramo najbolje u 2002."
Svetosavska Award to the best secondary school for results achieved in 2002/2003 school year of the Ministry of Education of the Republic of Serbia
International award for excellence in services & products, 2005
Recognition of "Dr Djordje Natosević" for outstanding results in education and training work 2005/2006 school year

Notable alumni
Porfirije, Serbian Patriarch
Isidor Bajić, music composer,
Đorđe Balašević, music artist
Rudolf Brucci, music composer
Đuro Daničić, philologist
Maja Gojković, mayor of Novi Sad
Olga Hadžić, mathematician
Dušan Kanazir, molecular biologist 
Laza Kostić, poet and translator
Petar Kralj, actor
Dušan Makavejev, director
Jovan Grčić Milenko, poet and physician
Svetozar Miletić, mayor of Novi Sad
Lazar Paču, minister of finance
Boško Petrović, novelist and poet
Pavel Jozef Šafárik, philologist
Milan Savić, physician, writer, and polymath
Jovan Soldatović, sculptor
Vasa Stajić, writer and philosopher
Josif Tatić, actor

See also
Skamija, a students' magazine.

References

Citations

Sources

Postanak i razvitak srpske pravoslavne velike gimnazije u Novom Sadu, V. Pušibrk, 1895.
Spomenica o stogodišnici srpske pravoslavne gimnazije u Novom Sadu, Novi Sad, 1910.
O prvim srpskim srednjim školama, Milan Šević, Belgrade, 1926.
Narodna enciklopedija, Dobrosav Popović, 1927.
Srpska pravoslavna velika gimnazija u Novom Sadu, Vasa Stajić, Novi Sad, 1949.
Novosadska gimnazija 1810-1960, Novi Sad, 1960.
Novosadska gimnazija 1810-1985, nastavak i razvoj, Novi Sad, 1986.
Srbi u Vojvodini, Book 2, Dušan J. Popović, Novi Sad, 1990.
Srbi u Vojvodini, Book 3, Dušan J. Popović, Novi Sad, 1990.
Istorija Srba u Hrvatskoj, Slavoniji i Ugarskoj (XV-XIV vek), Slavko Gavrilović, Belgrade, 1993.
Fudbalski klub Vojvodina iz Novog Sada u periodu od 1914-41, Petar Đurđev, Novi Sad, 2002.
 
 Gimnazija "Jovan Jovanović Zmaj" - Generacija 2006/7, Građanski list, Novi Sad, 2007.

External links
 Official site of the school (in Serbian)

Education in Novi Sad
Educational institutions established in 1810
Schools in Serbia
Schools in Vojvodina
Palaces in Serbia
Gymnasiums in Novi Sad
Buildings and structures in Novi Sad
Cultural Monuments of Great Importance (Serbia)